Semaeopus callichroa is a moth of the family Geometridae first described by Louis Beethoven Prout in 1938. It is found on Jamaica.

References

Moths described in 1938
Cosymbiini